Anna Szafraniec (born 16 February 1981) is a Polish mountain biker. 

She was born in Myślenice. She competed at the 2004 Summer Olympics, in women's cross-country cycling.

References

External links 
 

1981 births
Living people
Sportspeople from Lesser Poland Voivodeship
Polish female cyclists
Olympic cyclists of Poland
Cyclists at the 2004 Summer Olympics
People from Myślenice
21st-century Polish women